Newtown & Chilwell Sporting Club, nicknamed the Eagles, is an Australian rules football and netball club based in the inner western suburb of Newtown, Victoria.

The club teams currently compete in the regional Geelong Football Netball League, playing their home games at Elderslie Reserve.

History
Chilwell Football Club (formed 1874) and Newtown Football Club (formed 1874/1875) were affiliated with the following leagues:
Geelong District Football Association (GDFA), 1879–1918 
Geelong District Football League (GDFL), 1919–1921 
Geelong Junior Football Association (GJFA), 1922–1932 
Geelong District Football League (GDFL), 1933 

In 1933 the Newtown Football Club and the Chilwell Football Club merged to form the Newtown & Chilwell Football Club. The merger of two of Geelong's oldest clubs was because Newtown had difficulty getting players so they looked to their neighboring club, Chilwell. The club also has a historical link to the Barwon Football Club, which at its peak in the mid-1870s was one of the strongest clubs in Victoria, before it merged into Chilwell in 1879.

When the league was formed in 1979 the Eagles were one of the 10 clubs that broke away from the Geelong & District Football League. The city and country clubs of the old GDFL were divided into the major league competition of the GFL and the minor league GDFL.

VFL/AFL players 
 Bert Rankin - 
 Noel Rayson - , 
 Cliff Rankin - 
 Brendan McCartney (coach) - 
 Will Schofield - 
 Hugh Strahan - 
 Stephen Lunn - 
 Basil Flynn - 
 Tanner Bruhn -

Bibliography

References

External links

 Teamapp website
 SportsTG website

Geelong Football League clubs
1933 establishments in Australia
Geelong & District Football League clubs
Sports clubs established in 1933
Australian rules football clubs established in 1933
Netball teams in Geelong
Australian rules football clubs in Geelong